Yvan Roy is a justice with the Federal Court of Canada. Before his appointment he was a lawyer with the Government of Canada, Privy Council Office.

Notable cases
He rejected an application by Catalonian leader Carles Puigdemont for a visa to visit Canada.
He ruled that Bombardier Recreational Products (BRP) was entitled to a $135 Canadian dollar payment for each of nearly 21,000 Arctic Cat snowmobiles infringing on a BRP patent that were sold in Canada between 2008 and 2014.

He has also ruled in several other immigration cases.

References

Judges of the Federal Court of Canada
Year of birth missing (living people)
Living people
Canadian civil servants
HEC Montréal alumni
Université de Montréal Faculty of Law alumni